The 2003 season was the Minnesota Vikings' 43rd in the National Football League. They finished second in the NFC North with a 9–7 record, behind the 10–6 Green Bay Packers, but missed the playoffs for a third straight year. Despite gaining 6,294 yards of offense over their 16 games, by far the most in the league, the team managed just 416 points, the sixth-most in the NFL. The Vikings won their first six games of the 2003 season, then lost their next four games, after which they alternated wins and losses for the remainder of the season.  The Vikings were officially eliminated from postseason contention with a loss to the Arizona Cardinals on the last play of their final game.

Wide receiver Randy Moss led the NFL with 17 touchdown receptions, the third time in his career that he led the league in that category. After two seasons of inconsistency, rejuvenated quarterback Daunte Culpepper was voted to play in the second Pro Bowl of his career at the end of the season.

Offseason

2003 draft

 While attempting to agree a trade, the Vikings' time elapsed, allowing the Jacksonville Jaguars to move up and select QB Byron Leftwich. The Carolina Panthers were also able to select OT Jordan Gross before the Vikings ultimately selected DT Kevin Williams.
 The Vikings traded their fifth-round selection (142nd overall) to the Cleveland Browns in exchange for Cleveland's 2002 seventh-round selection and defensive lineman Stalin Colinet.
 The Vikings traded quarterback Todd Bouman to the New Orleans Saints in exchange for New Orleans' sixth-round selection (190th overall).

Preseason

Schedule

Game summaries

Week 1: vs. Jacksonville Jaguars

Week 2: at Kansas City Chiefs

Week 3: at Oakland Raiders

Week 4: vs. Arizona Cardinals

Regular season

Schedule

Game summaries

Week 1: at Green Bay Packers

Week 2: vs. Chicago Bears

Week 3: at Detroit Lions

Week 4: vs. San Francisco 49ers

Week 5: at Atlanta Falcons

Week 7: vs. Denver Broncos

Week 8: vs. New York Giants

Week 9: vs. Green Bay Packers

Week 10: at San Diego Chargers

Week 11: at Oakland Raiders

Week 12: vs. Detroit Lions

Week 13: at St. Louis Rams

Week 14: vs. Seattle Seahawks

Week 15: at Chicago Bears

Week 16: vs. Kansas City Chiefs

Week 17: at Arizona Cardinals

Despite still having a chance to make the playoffs by winning the NFC North, the Vikings squandered a 17–6 fourth-quarter lead in the final two minutes and lost to the 3–12 Arizona Cardinals after Josh McCown threw a 28-yard pass to Nate Poole for the game-winning touchdown with no time left, and with the Packers' win over the Broncos, giving them the NFC North title, and ending the Vikings season.

Standings

Statistics

Team leaders

* Vikings single season record

League rankings

Staff

Roster

References

Minnesota Vikings seasons
Minnesota
Minnesota